James Frey (born 1969) is an American writer, author of A Million Little Pieces.

James Frey may also refer to:

James N. Frey (born 1943), American writer, author of How to Write a Damn Good Novel and numerous Cold War era political thrillers
Jim Frey (born 1931), Major League Baseball manager
James Frey (Dean of Armagh) (1605–?), Swiss dean in Ireland

See also
James Barnet Fry (1827–1894), U.S. Army officer and historical writer
James Frye (1709–1776), American Revolutionary War soldier